The Southeastern Conference (SEC) sponsors nine men's sports and twelve women's sports. This is a list of conference champions for each sport.  Also see the list of SEC national champions.

Members
The SEC was established on December 1932, when the 13 members of the Southern Conference located west and south of the Appalachian Mountains left to form their own conference. Ten of the 13 founding members have remained in the conference since its inception. Three schools left the conference before 1966 and four have joined since 1991, bringing the current membership to 14. The membership will expand further to 16 in 2024.

Current members
Alabama (since 1932)
Arkansas (since 1991)
Auburn (since 1932)
Florida (since 1932)
Georgia (since 1932)
Kentucky (since 1932)
LSU (since 1932)
Mississippi (since 1932) – athletically known as "Ole Miss"
Mississippi State (since 1932)
Missouri (since 2012)
South Carolina (since 1991)
Tennessee (since 1932)
Texas A&M (since 2012)
Vanderbilt (since 1932)

Future members
Oklahoma (2024)
Texas (2024)

Former members
Sewanee: 1932–1940
Georgia Tech: 1932–1964
Tulane: 1932–1966

Current champions

Men's sports

Women's sports

Baseball

All 14 SEC schools play baseball.

Although this article lists both regular-season and tournament champions, the SEC awards its official baseball championship based solely on regular-season record, whether or not the tournament existed at a given time. The tournament, however, does determine the SEC's automatic berth in the NCAA tournament.

The method to determine the SEC Champion has varied greatly:
1933-1947: Determined by conference winning percentage.
1948-1950: Division leaders met in best of 5 championship series.
1951: Determined by conference winning percentage.
1952: Division leaders were to meet in best of 3 championship series; Eastern division leader ceded championship series to western division leader.
1953-1976: Division leaders met in best of 3 championship series.
1977-1985: First SEC Tournament. Determined by top 2 teams from each division playing in double elimination tournament.
1986: Determined by top 4 teams overall playing in double elimination tournament.
1987: Determined by top 6 teams overall playing in double elimination tournament.
1988-1991: Determined by conference winning percentage. Tournament played to award NCAA auto-bid.
1992: Determined by conference winning percentage.
1993-1995: Determined by conference and tournament winning percentage. NCAA auto-bid is awarded to winner of divisional tournament that *has highest overall conference winning percentage.
1996-1997: Determined by conference winning percentage. Tournament played with top 3 teams in each division plus 2 at-large teams based on conference winning percentage to award NCAA auto-bid.
1998: Determined as before but with division leaders earning top 2 seeds in tournament.
1999-2012: Determined as before but tournament consisted of top 2 teams in each division plus 4 at-large teams based on conference winning percentage.

Champions

Official SEC champions in bold.

Men's basketball

All current and future SEC members play men's basketball.

Although this article lists both regular-season and tournament champions, the SEC has awarded its official men's basketball championship based solely on regular-season record since the 1950–51 season, whether or not the tournament existed at a given time. The tournament, however, does determine the SEC's automatic berth in the NCAA tournament.

Champions

Official SEC champions in bold.

Division champions (1992–2011)
When the SEC expanded to 12 schools with the addition of South Carolina and Arkansas  for the 1992 season, the conference divided its basketball teams into separate divisions, East and West, just like for football. In June 2011, the SEC voted to eliminate divisions in basketball.

Women's basketball

All current and future members play women's basketball.

Although the SEC began sponsoring women's basketball competition in the 1979–80 season, it was not fully integrated into the conference until the 1982–83 season, which was the first in which each team played the same number of conference games. Also, although this article lists both regular-season and tournament champions, the SEC has officially awarded its conference title based solely on the regular-season standings since the 1985–86 season. From 1980 to 1985, the official SEC champion was the tournament winner, but the tournament now only determines the recipient of the SEC's automatic berth in the NCAA tournament.

Champions

Cross country
All SEC schools participate in men's and women's cross country except South Carolina, which only fields a women's team.

Champions

Equestrian
Four SEC schools compete in Women's Equestrian: Auburn, Georgia, South Carolina and Texas A&M. The first conference championship was contested in 2013.

Champions

Football
All 14 SEC schools play football.

Champions

Pre-championship game era (1933–1991)

Championship Game era (1992–present)

Divisional champions
Since the SEC expanded in 1992, divisional champions have been crowned. Occasionally, a tie between two or more teams occurs, requiring a tie-breaker. All teams involved in the tie-breaker are considered co-divisional champions, and the winner of the tie-breaker is the division's representative to the Championship Game. Below is list of all divisional champions and co-champions:

* denotes tie-break winner and subsequent division representative to the SEC Championship Game.
† in 1993 Auburn finished first in the West standings but was ineligible due to NCAA probation and postseason ban.
‡ in 2002 Alabama finished first in the West standings but was ineligible due to NCAA probation and postseason ban.

Southern Conference football champions

The Southern Conference was an immediate predecessor to the SEC, with all thirteen charter SEC schools having been members before leaving to form the SEC after the 1932 season.

Southern Intercollegiate Athletic Association

The Southern Intercollegiate Athletic Association (SIAA) was a predecessor to the Southern Conference, with every current, former, and future member of the SEC having been members at some point except Arkansas, Missouri, and Oklahoma.

Golf
All 14 SEC schools play both men's and women's golf.

Champions

Women's gymnastics
Eight SEC schools participate in women's gymnastics: Alabama, Arkansas, Auburn, Florida, Georgia, Kentucky, LSU, and Missouri. Future member Oklahoma also sponsors the sport.

In 2017, the SEC began recognizing a regular season champion in addition to the winner of the SEC Championship meet. LSU claimed the first regular season title.

Champions

Indoor track and field
All 14 SEC schools participate in both men's and women's indoor track & field except Vanderbilt, which once sponsored the sport for both sexes but now sponsors it only for women.

Champions

Outdoor track and field
All 14 SEC schools participate in outdoor track & field for both sexes except for Vanderbilt, which sponsors the sport only for women.

Champions

Soccer
All 14 schools play women's soccer, as do future members Oklahoma and Texas. While only women's soccer is sponsored by the SEC, Kentucky and South Carolina both have men's soccer teams in the Sun Belt Conference.

Champions

Tournament runners-up
1993 - Arkansas
1994 - Auburn
1995 - Alabama
1996 - Arkansas
1997 - Vanderbilt
1998 - Vanderbilt
1999 - Mississippi
2000 - Georgia
2001 - Auburn
2002 - Florida
2003 - Florida
2004 - Tennessee
2005 - Auburn
2006 - Florida
2007 - Georgia
2008 - Georgia
2009 - LSU
2010 - South Carolina
2011 - Florida
2012 - Auburn
2013 - Florida
2014 - Kentucky
2015 - Texas A&M
2016 - Arkansas
2017 - Arkansas
2018 - Arkansas
2019 - Arkansas
2020–21 – Arkansas
2022 - Alabama

Other division winners
1995 - Alabama (West)
1996 - Arkansas (West)
1997 - Alabama (West)
1998 - Alabama (West)
1999 - Mississippi (West)
2000 - Mississippi (West)
2001 - Mississippi State, Auburn (West)
2002 - Tennessee (East)
2003 - Auburn (West)
2004 - Auburn (West)
2005 - Mississippi (West)
2006 - Auburn (West)
2007 - LSU (West)
2008 - Auburn, LSU (West)
2009 - LSU (West)
2010 - Auburn (West)
2011 - LSU (West)
2012 - Texas A&M (West)
2019 – Vanderbilt (East)
2020–21 – Tennessee (East)

 Divisional winners discontinued from 2013–2018.

Softball

All current and future SEC schools except Vanderbilt play softball.

Champions

Tournament runners-up
1997 - Florida
1998 - Mississippi State
1999 - Arkansas
2000 - LSU
2001 - South Carolina
2002 - Georgia
2003 - LSU
2004 - Georgia
2005 - Georgia
2006 - LSU
2007 - Florida
2008 - Alabama
2009 - Alabama
2010 - LSU
2011 - Georgia
2012 - Florida
2013 - Missouri
2014 - Kentucky
2015 - Tennessee
2016 - LSU
2017 - LSU
2018 - South Carolina
2019 – Alabama
2021 – Florida
2022 – Missouri

Other division winners
1997 - LSU (West)
1998 - LSU (West)
1999 - Tennessee, South Carolina (East)
2000 - Kentucky (East)
2001 - South Carolina (East)
2002 - South Carolina (East)
2003 - Alabama (West)
2004 - Tennessee (East)
2005 - Georgia (East)
2006 - Georgia (East)
2007 - LSU (West)
2007 - Alabama (West)
2008 - Alabama (West)
2009 - Alabama (West)
2010 - Florida (East)
2011 - Florida (East)
2012 - Tennessee (East)
2013 - LSU (West)
Division winners discontinued in 2014

Swimming and diving
10 SEC schools participate in men's swimming and diving, and 12 in women's swimming and diving.

The following schools have both men's and women's teams: Alabama, Auburn, Florida, Georgia, Kentucky, LSU, Missouri, South Carolina, Tennessee and Texas A&M. Future member Texas also has men's and women's teams.

Arkansas and Vanderbilt sponsor the sport for women only. The two Mississippi schools and future member Oklahoma do not sponsor the sport at all.

Champions

Men's tennis
All current and future SEC schools play men's tennis except for Missouri.

From 1953-1989, the SEC Champion was determined by the accumulation of points in an individual flighted tournament (there was not a separate team tournament champion).

In 1990, a team dual match format was instituted for the conference tournament which provided the SEC tournament champion.

From 1990-98, the SEC Champion was determined by a total aggregate points accumulated at the conclusion of the conference tournament: one full
point was awarded for each regular-season conference win, one-half point for wins in the first two rounds of the conference tournament, one-half point for receiving a first-round bye in the conference tournament and one full point for a win in the conference tournament semifinals and finals.

For the 1999 season, the same points system was in place with a couple of changes: one full point for first-round bye in the conference tournament and one full point for a win in any round of the conference tournament.

In 2000, the SEC changed the determination of its tennis regular season champion to the team with the best winning percentage in conference regular-season dual matches.

Champions

Tournament runners-up
1990 - Georgia
1991 - Mississippi State
1992 - LSU
1993 - Mississippi State
1994 - Mississippi State
1995 - LSU
1996 - Georgia
1997 - Georgia
1998 - Georgia
1999 - Georgia
2000 - Georgia
2001 - Tennessee
2002 - Auburn
2003 - Florida
2004 - Ole Miss
2005 - Tennessee
2006 - Ole Miss
2007 - Ole Miss
2008 - Florida
2009 - Tennessee
2010 - Florida
2011 - Kentucky
2012 - Kentucky
2013 - Tennessee
2014 - Florida
2015 - Georgia
2016 - Georgia
2017 - Mississippi State
2018 - Texas A&M

Other division winners
2002 - Ole Miss (West)
2003 - Ole Miss (West)
2004 - Florida (East)
2005 - Florida (East), Ole Miss (West)
2006 - Ole Miss (West)
2007 - Ole Miss (West)
2008 - Ole Miss (West)
2009 - Georgia (East)
2010 - Ole Miss (West)
2011 - Mississippi State (West)
2012 - Mississippi State (West)
2013 - Texas A&M, Ole Miss (West)

Divisional winners discontinued in 2014

Women's tennis
All current and future SEC schools play women's tennis.

In 2000, the SEC changed the determination of its tennis champions to the team with the best winning percentage in conference regular-season dual matches (11 matches). Before this, a points system was used in which full- or half-points were awarded for wins during the season as well as during the conference tournament.

Champions

Tournament runners-up
1990 - Georgia
1991 - Georgia
1992 - Georgia
1993 - Georgia
1994 - Florida
1995 - Georgia
1996 - Vanderbilt
1997 - Georgia
1998 - Georgia
1999 - Florida
2000 - Georgia
2001 - Tennessee
2002 - South Carolina
2003 - Georgia
2004 - Vanderbilt
2005 - Kentucky
2006 - Kentucky
2007 - Florida
2008 - Florida
2009 - Tennessee
2010 - Tennessee
2011 - Tennessee
2012 - Georgia
2013 - Georgia
2014 - Alabama
2015 - Georgia
2016 - Georgia
2017 - Florida
2018 - Florida
2019 - Georgia
2020 - Not held
2021 - Texas A&M
2022 - Georgia

Other division winners
2002 - Auburn (West)
2003 - Alabama (West)
2004 - LSU (West)
2005 - Mississippi State, Ole Miss (West)
2006 - Alabama (West)
2007 - LSU, Auburn (West)
2008 - Arkansas (West)
2009 - Arkansas (West)
2010 - Ole Miss (West)
2011 - Alabama (West)
2012 - Alabama (West)
2013 - Florida, Georgia (East), Texas A&M (West)

 Divisional winners discontinued in 2014

Volleyball
Thirteen SEC schools, as well as future members Oklahoma and Texas, play women's volleyball. Vanderbilt played in the first SEC tournament in 1979, but dropped the sport after that season; it will reinstate women's volleyball in 2025. The SEC does not currently sponsor men's volleyball, and no current or future conference member has a varsity men's team.

The SEC Volleyball Tournament was suspended for three seasons after the 2005 season. It was not renewed, but, with the NCAA on the verge of officially adding beach volleyball (then called "sand volleyball") to its Emerging Sports program, the conference's coaches instead sponsored a Commissioner's Cup tournament for that variation of the sport. The tournaments, which were held in mid-April between 2008–10, were won by Georgia, South Carolina, and LSU respectively.

On March 14, 2023, the SEC announced that the women's volleyball tournament will be reinstated in the near future. At the time, the conference had not decided whether the tournament would resume in 2024 (when Oklahoma and Texas join) or 2025 (when Vanderbilt reinstates women's volleyball).

Champions

 The 2020 season was split into fall and spring phases due to COVID-19. 
 From 1979–1982 regular-season conference standings were not tabulated.

Tournament runners-up
1979 - Tennessee
1980 - Tennessee
1981 - Alabama
1982 - LSU
1983 - Tennessee
1984 - Kentucky
1985 - LSU
1986 - Georgia
1987 - Florida
1988 - Tennessee
1989 - Kentucky
1990 - Georgia
1991 - Florida
1992 - LSU
1993 - Georgia
1994 - Georgia
1995 - Arkansas
1996 - Arkansas
1997 - Florida
1998 - Arkansas
1999 - Arkansas
2000 - LSU
2001 - Arkansas
2002 - Arkansas
2003 - Arkansas
2004 - Florida
2005 - Alabama

Other division winners
1995 - Arkansas (West)
1996 - Arkansas (West)
1997 - Arkansas (West)
1998 - Arkansas (West)
1999 - Arkansas (West)
2000 - Alabama (West)
2001 - Arkansas (West)
2002 - Arkansas (West)
2003 - Arkansas (West)
2004 - Arkansas, Alabama (West)
2005 - LSU, Arkansas (West)
2006 - LSU (West)
2007 - LSU (West)
2008 - LSU (West)
2009 - Kentucky (East)
2010 - LSU (West)
2011 - LSU (West)
2012 - Texas A&M (West)

Divisional winners discontinued in 2013

References
 College Football Data Warehouse
 SEC Website (Some Champ Data)

Champions
Southeastern Conference